Live at the Five Spot is a live album by jazz pianist Randy Weston recorded in 1959 at the Five Spot Café and originally released on the United Artists label.

Reception

The contemporaneous DownBeat reviewer, Ira Gitler, praised the location sound quality and concluded that "Records like this are enough to restore your faith in jazz". AllMusic awarded the album 3 stars.

Track listing 
All compositions by Randy Weston except as indicated
 "Hi-Fly" 7:21
 "Beef Blues Stew" - 5:00
 "Where" - 5:53
 "Star Crossed Lovers" (Billy Strayhorn, Duke Ellington) - 5:09
 "Spot Five Blues" (Weston, Kenny Dorham) - 10:42
 "Lisa Lovely" - 4:38

Personnel 
Randy Weston - piano
Kenny Dorham - trumpet (tracks 1-3, 5 & 6)
Coleman Hawkins - tenor saxophone
Wilbur Little - bass
Clifford Jarvis (track 6), Roy Haynes - drums
Brock Peters - vocal (track 3)
Melba Liston - arranger

References 

Randy Weston live albums
1959 live albums
United Artists Records live albums
Albums produced by Tom Wilson (record producer)
Albums recorded at the Five Spot Café
Albums arranged by Melba Liston